Kosten is a surname. Notable people with the surname include:

 Anthony Kosten (born 1958), English-French chess Grandmaster
 Annabel Kosten (born 1977), Dutch swimmer